Kristin Hille Valla (born 31 December 1944 in Årdal) is a Norwegian politician in the Centre Party.

Biography 
From 1989 to 1990, while the cabinet Syse held office, Hille Valla was appointed Minister of the Environment.

On the local level she was a member of Nes municipal council from 1983 to 1987. From 1987 to 1991 she was a member of Buskerud county council. In 2001 she was appointed County Governor of Oppland.

From 1987 to 1991 she was the second vice leader of her party.

Outside politics she mainly worked as a teacher in Dovre and Nesbyen. From 1991 to 1998 she was the school director in Oppland county, and from 1998 to 2000 she was the director of the Norwegian Association of Local and Regional Authorities.

References

1944 births
Living people
Ministers of Climate and the Environment of Norway
Centre Party (Norway) politicians
Buskerud politicians
County governors of Norway
Women government ministers of Norway
20th-century Norwegian women politicians
20th-century Norwegian politicians
People from Årdal